Amboalimena is a town and commune in Madagascar. It belongs to the district of Belo sur Tsiribihina District, which is part of the Menabe Region. The population of the commune was estimated to be approximately 1,000 in 2001 commune census.

Only primary schooling is available. The majority of the population of the commune are farmers, while an additional 40% receives their livelihood from raising livestock. The most important crop is rice, while other important products are maize and sweet potatoes. Services provide employment for 5% of the population. Additionally fishing employs 5% of the population.

Geography
Amboalimena is situated at 60 km north of Belon'i Tsiribihina on the mouth of the Manambolo River.

References and notes 

Populated places in Menabe